Lizzano is a comune of 10,175 inhabitants (2013) in the province of Taranto in the Apulia region of southeast Italy.

Lizzano DOC
The area around Lizzano produces red, white, rose and sparkling Italian DOC wines. Grapes destined for reds and roses are limited to a harvest yield of 14 tonnes/ha with the finished wine needing to have a minimum alcohol level of 11.5%. White wine grapes are limited to a harvest yield of 12 tonnes/ha with minimum alcohol level of 10.5% The reds, roses and frizzante roses are blends composed primarily of Negroamaro (60-80%) with Montepulciano, Sangiovese, Bombino nero and Pinot noir making up the remaining. Malvasia nera can also be used but is limited to 10% of the blend. The whites, frizzantes and spumantes are a blend of 40-60% Trebbiano, at least 30% Chardonnay and/or Pinot blanc, up to 25% Sauvignon blanc and/or Bianco di Alessano and up to 10% Malvasia bianca.

See also
 List of Italian DOC wines

References

External links
 Italian Made "Lizzano DOC"

Cities and towns in Apulia
Localities of Salento